Dora Kathleen Gardner (6 May 1912 – June 1994) was an English track and field athlete who competed for Great Britain in the 1948 Olympic Games.

In 1948 she finished eighth in the Olympic high jump contest.

At the 1938 British Empire Games she won the silver medal in the high jump event. In the long jump competition she finished seventh.

In the 1938 European Athletics Championships she finished fifth in the high jump contest and in the 1946 European Championships in Athletics she finished seventh in the high jump event.

She died in Bournemouth.

References
sports-reference.com

1912 births
1994 deaths
English female high jumpers
British female high jumpers
British female long jumpers
Olympic athletes of Great Britain
Athletes (track and field) at the 1948 Summer Olympics
Athletes (track and field) at the 1938 British Empire Games
Commonwealth Games silver medallists for England
English female long jumpers
Commonwealth Games medallists in athletics
Medallists at the 1938 British Empire Games